Sukari (born 4 August 1974) is an Indonesian sprinter. He competed in the men's 4 × 100 metres relay at the 2000 Summer Olympics.

References

1974 births
Living people
Athletes (track and field) at the 2000 Summer Olympics
Indonesian male sprinters
Olympic athletes of Indonesia
Place of birth missing (living people)